The Weishi (WS) family of multiple rocket launcher systems were mainly developed by Sichuan Aerospace Industry Corporation (SCAIC, also known as Base 062) in Chengdu, China. The systems include the   WS-1, the improved  WS-1B, the  WS-1E, the  WS-2, as well as many other models. The WS-1 series weapon system did not enter PLA service and has order from Thailand. The WS-2 may finally see PLA service in the future. It's worth noticing that although sharing the same name, there are other developers for different models of Weishi series multiple rocket launchers (MRL) other than the primary developer SCAIC.

China Aerospace Long-March International ALIT (CASC) has published a table showing the ranges of most of the WS rockets. There are unguided, guided and precision guided rockets.

WS-1 
SCAIC began to develop an unguided large-calibre multiple launch rocket system for the PLA ground forces in the late 1980s. The resulting Weishi-1 (WS-1) 302 mm, 4-tube multiple rocket system was first tested in 1990. However, the weapon system failed to impress the PLA, and no production order was received. The ground equipment of the WS-1 comprises: a rocket launch truck, a transport and loading truck and a firing command truck.

A WS-1 rocket battalion is equipped with:

DZ-88B firing command truck (4 men): 1;
MF-4 rocket launch truck (3 men): 6~9;
QY-88 transport and loading truck (3 men): 6~9;
High-altitude meteorological radar (3 men): 1;
Rockets per launch truck: 40~60;

Khaibar-1 could be based on Weishi Rockets.

WS-1B 
SCAIC continued the WS-1 development in the 1990s and introduced the improved WS-1B in the late 1990s. The WS-1B mainly targeted foreign customers and was actively marketed by Beijing-based China National Precision Machinery Corporation (CPMIEC). Compared to the WS-1, the WS-1B features an increased range of 180 km.

A WS-1B rocket battalion is equipped with:

DZ-4B firing command truck (5 men): 1;
HF-4B rocket launch truck (3 men): 6~9;
QY-4B transport and loading truck (3 men): 6~9;
Type 702 high-altitude meteorological radar (3 men): 1;
Rockets per launch truck: 40~60;

WS-1E 
The WS-1E is the 122 mm multiple rocket system developed by SCAIC as a successor to the PLA's current Type 81 122 mm rocket system. It is similar to the Type 90 122 mm rocket system and did not enter production. A WS-1E rocket battalion is equipped with:

DZ-88B firing command truck (5 men): 1;
MF-40 rocket launch truck (3 men): 6;
Rockets per launch truck: 120~160;

WS-1F 
Little is known except that range reaches .

T-300 Kasırga 

The Turkish missile system, TRG-300 Kasırga MBRL (also called TRG-300) is based on Chinese WS-1B (Wei Shi; Guardian), with some modifications on the design with launcher very similar to the WS-1B's launcher. In Turkish land forces service, the 302 mm T-300 Kasirga MBRL system provides long range fire support.

The T-300 Kasirga MBRLS consists of two key parts: The launcher system (T-300) and the rocket, TR-300. The T-300 MBRL is based on the German MAN (6×6) 26.372 10t cross-country truck chassis. Combat weight, complete with four rockets, is 23t. This MAN (6×6) also serves as T-122 launch platform for Turkish land forces command. F-302T, the launcher vehicle's cabin windows are provided with shutters which are lowered before the rockets are launched.

TR300S:Unguided, range: 36–65 km
TR300E:Unguided, range: 65–100 km
TR300K:Guided, range: 30–120 km

WS-2 
During the 2004 Zhuhai Air Show, SCAIC revealed its latest WS-2 multiple launch rocket system.  The weapon is fitted with 6 box-shape launchers and fires 400 mm rockets to a maximum range of 200 km, however some sources claim that it might be up to 350 km. This enables the PLA to strike the west coast of Taiwan, including the capital Taipei. It is speculated that WS-2 is going to be a cheaper alternative to the expensive short range ballistic missiles in Chinese inventory. The WS-2 is fitted with a simple cascade inertial terminal guidance to compensate for the degraded accuracy caused by the long distance flight of the rocket. In 2008, it was revealed that sub-munitions are developed for WS-2, including a specialized anti-radar version, which is a rocket containing three UAVs.  Once the rocket is fired to the target area, the UAVs are released the same way like other sub-munitions.  The seekers would seek out target radar signals as UAVs began to cruise, and once locked on to the radar, UAV would home in and attack.  Some domestic Chinese military enthusiasts have claimed such technology was based on the principle of Israeli Harpy anti-radar UAVs, but this could not be confirmed by independent sources outside China.

A WS-1E and WS-2 rocket battalion shared the same equipment and is armed with:
Firing command truck (5 men): 1;
Rocket launch truck (3 men): 6;
Transport and loading truck (3 men): 6~9;
Rockets per launch truck: 30~48;
Preparation time (from traveling to firing) < 12 minutes
Firing density: better than 1/600 m
Accuracy: better than 0.3%

WS-2B 
Upgraded version with 200 km range.

WS-2C 
Upgraded version with GPS guidance and 350 km range. It also features passive homing guidance.

WS-2D 
Upgraded version with GPS guidance and 400 km range and ability to launch lethal unmanned aerial vehicles.

WS-3 
Built by China Aerospace Long-March International Trade (Alit) – a subsidiary of China Aerospace Science and Technology Corporation (CASC) – the WS-3 features 6 rectangular missile containers for 406 mm rockets, it has simple cascade inertial terminal guidance and has a range of 70-200 km.

WS-3A 
Also built by ALIT, the WS-3A is an upgraded version of the WS-3 with simple cascade inertial terminal guidance updated by civilian GPS/GLONASS, but can be upgraded to military GPS/GLONASS upon customer's request.

WS-3 ASW missile 
WS-3 ASW Rocket is a modified WS-3A carrying rocket assisted anti-submarine (ASW) torpedo, which is developed by Poly Technologies, a subsidiary of China Poly Group Corporation. Payload of the rocket is a light-weight ASW torpedo and the range is up to 100 km. Target info obtained by other ASW platforms including satellite, aircraft, surface ships, submarines, coastal and sea floor sonar stations, and is passed to the launch/storage/command/control vehicle, which in turn, fires the missile in the latest contact point. As the torpedo is separated from the rocket and enters water, it seeks out and destroys target.

WS-6 
Lighter version of unguided 122 mm PR50 MLS, with number of tubes reduced by 60% to 40 from the original 100 of PR50 MLS. This is a more compact version of PR50 with reduction of weight for rapid deployment.

WS-15 
WS-15 MRL is a shorter range version with 40 km range, equipped with simple cascade inertial terminal guidance.

WS-22 

WS-22 is a guided version of 122 mm PR50 MLR with simple cascade inertial terminal guidance, with standard range of 45 km.

PR50 MRL
Part of the WS export series. The vehicle has fire power increased by 25% to 50 round from the original 40 rounds. Incorporate features of WS SPMRL series so that the operating cost and overall life cycle cost for both. Also incorporated is a feature originated in Type 90B, which is the adoption of rockets of different ranges, so PR50 has a wide range of 20 km to 40 km. The Chinese name for PR50 SPMRL is Sha Chen Bao (沙尘暴), meaning Sandstorm, and the system made its public debut in 2006 at the 6th China International Aviation & Aerospace Exhibition.

WS-32 
Features two containers of five 300 mm tubes each on a 8X8 truck. Missile is 7.5 m and can carry a 170 kg warhead over 150 km with 30 m CEP accuracy.

WS-33 
Missile seems to be an adaptation of a Chinese anti-ship missile for ground attack roles. It is 3.3 m long, 200 kg and 200 mm caliber, can hit targets 70 km away.

WS-35 
Development of WS-1 series of 150 km range with civilian GPS/GLONASS satellite guidance update, but can be upgrade to military GPS/GLONASS upon customer's request.

WS-43 
The WS-43 cruise missile, also called loitering munition, has 200 mm caliber, 60 km range, 10 m CEP accuracy,  with 30 minutes loitering time and uses a 20 kg warhead.

WS-63 
Surface to surface missile, 7.4 m long and 300 mm caliber, capable of hitting targets 260 km away with different types of 150 kg warheads. Inertial/satellite guidance plus radar terminal guidance.

WS-64 
WS-64 is an anti-ship missile, in different versions, with a ranges from 120 to 280 km, likely based on the HQ-16, launched by the Weishi MLRS system. CEP is 30 m when using satnav, 10 when using active radar guidance. It was revealed at the 2014 Zhuhai Air Show by CASC

WS-400 
Anti-submarine missile.

WS-600L 
New short-range ballistic missile developed by CASC, with a range of 290 km and a CEP of less than 10 meters.

A100 

Development of WS-1 series with simple cascade inertial terminal guidance. Using standard munitions, the range is 40 – 80 km, and when using extended range rounds, the range is increased to 60 – 120 km. The 10-tube launchers contained 2 5-round launching boxes arranged in 2 rows, 2 on top, and 3 at the bottom.

A200 
Development of A100 with simple cascade inertial terminal guidance updated by GPS.  The arrangement of A200 is different from A100 in that each launching box consists of three rows of launching tubes, three on the top and bottom respectively, and two in the middle.  A200 rockets also have additional forward control surfaces that were not present on A100 rockets.

A300 
Development of A200, 2 pods with four 300-mm rockets each, with a range of 290 km and integrated GNSS/INS guidance.  30 to 45 m circular error probable (CEP).

SY-300 
SY-300 is a development of WS-2/3, with SY standing for Shen Ying (神鹰 meaning Divine Eagle), designed after the 4th Academy and the 9th Academy of CASC were merged to form a new 4th Academy.  The main difference between the SY300 and its WS-2/3 predecessor is that for WS-2/3, the control section of the forward control surfaces and the warhead are integrated into a single unit, but they are separated in SY-300.  This design difference enables the guidance system of SY300 to be rapidly changed in the field by soldiers, by simply replacing the guidance system with a dummy weight, when SY-300 needs to be used as an unguided rocket. Each vehicle can carry either six or twelve SY300 rockets.

SY-400 
SY-400 is a further development of SY-300, that can carry either two short-range ballistic missiles BP-12A with range of 400 km or twelve 300 mm PHL-03 rockets. As a low cost alternative to more expensive ballistic missiles, the accuracy of SY400 is increased by adding GPS to correct the cascade inertial navigational guidance, and according to the developer, the accuracy can be further improved if military grade GPS signals are used to replacing the existing civilian GPS signal.  Another feature of SY-400 is that it shares the same launching vehicle and fire control system of BP-12A ballistic missile, thus simplifying logistics.

In 2017, Qatar received an unknown number of SY-400. In 2020 Myanmar received undisclosed number of SY-400 system.

CM-400AKG 
The CM-400AKG is an air-launched derivative of the SY-400 tactical ballistic missile developed by the China Aerospace Science and Industry Corporation.
The CM-400AKG is advertised as having a 5.1 m. length, a 400 mm. diameter, a mass of 910 kg., a range of 100–240 km., and capable of carrying either a 150 kg. blast warhead or 200 kg. penetration warhead. It has a high cruise altitude and a steep terminal dive, with a maximum terminal speed of Mach 4.5-5. Seeker options include "INS + GNSS + Passive Radar Seeker," potentially for anti-ship with a circular error probable (CEP) of 5 m., and "INS-GNSS+IR/TV Seeker", with a CEP of 5–10 m. Pakistan air force officials described the missile as "an aircraft carrier killer."

The CM-400AKG was unveiled at the 2012 China International Aviation & Aerospace Exhibition, where it was claimed to have entered service on Pakistan Air Force CAC/PAC JF-17 Thunders. At the 2013 Dubai Airshow, a Pakistani military source claimed the missile was in Chinese service, and that an anti-ship version was in development. In 2014, a PAF JF-17 was spotted carrying two – possibly mock-up – CM-400AKGs, suggesting the missile was still in development.

At the 2013 Paris Air Show, Fábrica Argentina de Aviones officials revealed the missile's performance was a major reason for their interest in co-producing the JF-17.

Armament 
The free rocket used by the WS-1 and WS-1B consists of the warhead and fuse, an FG-42/43 rocket motor and the tail section. The FG-42/43 rocket motor is a single chamber, solid rocket motor with an advanced hydroxy-terminated polybutadine (HTPB) composition rocket propellant. The rocket of the WS-2 system features four control surfaces in the middle section of the rocket for terminal guidance.

The rocket can be fitted with various types of warheads including anti-armour/personnel submunition, blasting, fuel air explosive (FAE), and high-explosive (HE). The ZDB-2 blasting warhead is loaded with steel balls and prefabricated fragments. The SZB-1 submunition warhead is designed to destroy large area targets such as armour formation and infantry troops. When the SZB-1 submunition warhead detonates, around 500 bullets are expelled under high pressure.

Launch truck 
The launch truck is available in a number of variants. The MF-4 launch truck is based on a Chinese indigenous 6X6 truck chassis. The HF-4 launch truck is based on the more capable Tiema XC2200 6X6 truck. The WS-2 uses a heavier 8X8 Taian TA580/TAS5380 truck chassis. The launch tubes have an elevation range of 0° to 60° and azimuth range of -30° to +30°. The truck is equipped with four hydraulically operated stabilisers which are lowered in preparation for the rocket launch.

Operators

Current operators 
 - AR-1A
 - T-300 Kasırga
 - T-300 Kasirga & 74 units of WS-22 
 - A200
 - A200
Tigray People's Liberation Front - A200
 Hamas – WS-1E
 - WS-1 imported in the late 80s or early 90s.
 - WS1B KN-09 (MRL) (?)
 - SY-400
 - A-100
 - M-302

 - Sudan has acquired an unconfirmed number of the advanced Chinese WS-2 Multiple Rocket launcher In 2009.
 - A-100
 - WS-1B as DTI-1. Technology transfer, produce under license with Thai software.
 - TRG-300 Kasırga
 - SY-400
 - 36 WS-2D launchers

References 

Self-propelled rocket launchers
Self-propelled artillery of the People's Republic of China
Multiple rocket launchers
Surface-to-surface missiles
Military vehicles introduced in the 1990s